Ullam may refer to:

 Ullam (2005 film), a Malayalam-language film directed by M. K. Sukumaran, starring Suresh Gopi and Geethu Mohandas
 Ullam (2012 film), a Tamil-language film directed by Arunmoorthy, starring Mithun Tejaswi and Priyamani